Định Hóa is a rural district of Thái Nguyên province in the Northeast region of Vietnam. As of 2003 the district had a population of 90,086. The district covers an area of 521 km². The district capital lies at Chợ Chu.

Administrative divisions
Chợ Chu, Bảo Cường, Bảo Linh, Bình Thành, Bình Yên, Bộc Nhiêu, Điềm Mặc, Định Biên, Đồng Thịnh, Kim Phượng, Kim Sơn, Lam Vỹ, Linh Thông, Phú Đình, Phú Tiến, Phúc Chu, Phượng Tiến, Quy Kỳ, Sơn Phú, Tân Dương, Tân Thịnh, Thanh Định, Trung Hội, Trung Lương.

References

Districts of Thái Nguyên province
Thái Nguyên province